Matt Williams (born 1971) is a British sports presenter and reporter on BBC Radio 2 and later Greatest Hits Radio.

Background
Born in Southport, Lancashire, Williams grew up in Formby near Liverpool and was educated at Holy Family High School in Thornton before studying French and Spanish at Bradford University.

He started at BBC Radio Cumbria working as a reporter and in 1991 joined BBC Radio 1 on the Newsbeat programme. Starting with 5 Live sport in 2001 he has worked on the 5 Live Breakfast programme from 2003 to 2008, before moving to 5 Live's Drive programme.  He then moved to Radio 2 to become the sports presenter on the Simon Mayo Drivetime programme and is now the sports presenter on Simon Mayo's new drivetime show on Greatest Hits Radio, and was a member of the team which won the Sony Radio Academy Awards for Best Music Programme in 2011.

In addition to sports presenting, Williams participated in the Confessions feature and in the Quiz until May 2018. He also styles himself as Dr. Mosh promoting loud rock, hardcore punk and metal music on Radio 2 with songs from artists such as Led Zeppelin, Lawnmower Deth, Black Sabbath, Guns N' Roses and Uriah Heep.

After leaving Radio 2, he became the head of communications at the British Equestrian Federation.

References

External links   

Living people
1971 births
People from Southport
British sports journalists
BBC radio presenters
BBC Radio 2 presenters
Alumni of the University of Bradford